Dylan João Raymond Collard Jr. (born 16 April 2000) is an international footballer who players as a midfielder for Marítimo. Born in Australia, he plays for the Mauritius national team.

Collard played youth football with Quakers Hill Tigers in Australia before moving to Portugal to join Benfica's academy. After playing for various youth teams in Portugal, Collard made his senior debut for Lusitano in the Campeonato de Portugal in 2019. After a short time at Polish II Liga side Stal Rzeszów, Collard returned to Portugal to sign for Marítimo, where he has since played for the sides reserve team.

Collard made his debut for the Mauritian national team in 2022.

Early life
Collard was born in the Sydney suburb of Randwick, New South Wales, and moved to Parklea at a young age. He began playing football at age four, and his first football club was Quakers Hill Tigers.

After attracting interest from scouts from Portuguese side Benfica while on a family trip to Portugal, Collard subsequently joined the club's academy, where he remained for several seasons.

Club career
In June 2019, Collard signed for Campeonato de Portugal side Lusitano, his first senior deal. Collard was a frequent starter in his time at the club.

Collard joined Polish II Liga side Stal Rzeszów in February 2020. He made only one competitive appearance for the club.

In October 2020, Collard returned to Portugal to sign with Marítimo

International career
In March 2022, Collard was called up to the Mauritius national football team, eligible through his Mauritian father.

Collard made his international debut for Mauritius on 24 March 2022, playing as a forward in a 1–0 loss to São Tomé and Príncipe in 2023 Africa Cup of Nations qualification. He scored his first international goal in the second leg, three days later, which finished 3–3.

Career statistics

International

Mauritius score listed first, score column indicates score after each Collard goal

See also
List of foreign Primeira Liga players

References

External links

2000 births
Living people
People from the Eastern Suburbs (Sydney)
Soccer players from Sydney
Mauritian footballers
Mauritius international footballers
Australian people of Mauritian descent
Australian soccer players
Stal Rzeszów players
Lusitano FCV players
C.S. Marítimo players
Primeira Liga players
Campeonato de Portugal (league) players
II liga players
Mauritian expatriate footballers
Expatriate footballers in Portugal
Mauritian expatriate sportspeople in Portugal